Andi Muhammad Suryady bin Bandy (born 29 June 1981) is a Malaysian politician who is serving as the State Assistant Minister. He has served as the Member of Sabah State Legislative Assembly (MLA) for Tanjung Batu since September 2020. He is a member of the United Malays National Organisation (UMNO) which is aligned with the ruling Perikatan Nasional (PN) coalition both in federal and state levels.

Election results

References

Members of the Sabah State Legislative Assembly
United Malays National Organisation politicians
Living people
1981 births